Muhammad Tito Karnavian (born 26 October 1964) is an Indonesian retired police officer who is currently serving as Minister of Home Affairs since 2019. Previously, he served as chief of the Indonesian National Police from 2016 to 2019 and chief of the National Counter Terrorism Agency in 2016.

Early life and education

Education 
Tito got his first formal education at SMA Negeri 2 Palembang and continued  at the Indonesian Military Academy in 1987 because it was funded by the government. In 1993 , Tito completed his education at the University of Exeter in England and earned an MA in Police Studies, and completed his education at the College of Police Science (STIK) in Jakarta in 1996and earned a Bachelor's Degree in Police Studies.

Elementary school and junior high school are taken at Xaverius School, where his senior high school was at SMA Negeri 2 Palembang. When he was in grade 3, Tito started taking some undergraduate exams. He passed all tests, which included the Indonesian Armed Forces Academy, Medicine at Sriwijaya University , International Relations at Gadjah Mada University, and the State College of Accountancy. Eventually, he opted the Indonesian Military Academy, particularly the Police Academy.

Education 
 Primary School: SD Xaverius 4 Palembang, Indonesia (1976)
 Secondary School: SMP Xaverius 2 Palembang, Indonesia (1980)
 High School: SMA Negeri 2 Palembang, Indonesia (1983) 
 Police Academy: Akademi Kepolisian Semarang, Indonesia (1987),
 Master of Arts (M.A.) in Police Studies, University of Exeter, UK (1993)
 Perguruan Tinggi Ilmu Kepolisian / PTIK (Police Science College), Jakarta, Indonesia (1996)
 Royal New Zealand Air Force Command & Staff College, Auckland, New Zealand (Sesko) (1998) 
 Bachelor of Arts (B.A.) in Strategic Studies, Massey University. New Zealand (1998)
 Ph.D in Strategic Studies with interest on Terrorism and Islamist Radicalization at S. Rajaratnam School of International Studies, Nanyang Technological University, Singapore (2013)

As Minister of Home Affairs
Split of Papua and West Papua Provinces
Shortly after his inauguration as Home Affairs Minister in October 2019, Tito confirmed that there would be a formation of a South Papua province, which was to be split from Papua.

Later on, in April 2021, Tito proposed on splitting Western New Guinea into six provinces; Southwest Papua, West Papua, Central Papua, Central Mountains, South Papua, and Papua Tabi Saireri.

Covid-19 Mitigation Efforts

Tito also involved in national Covid-19 mitigation efforts during 2020 world pandemics. In his involvement, he issued instructions to all local governments on health restrictions policies, including the 2022 year end holidays restrictions.

At the end of the year, he also issued the abolishment of health restrictions policies, as instructed by President Joko Widodo, considering that the national situation on pandemic is under control and the immune system of wider people have been better after several stages of vaccinations.

2020 Local Leaders Election

On 2020 elections, Titio played an important role in succeeding 270 local elections with some 140 millions voters across the country. He applied specific policies to prevent the surge of Covid-19 cases, which resulted the democratic elections run smoothly without any increse in Covid-19 cases.

Publications 

 Indonesian Top Secret: Membongkar Konflik Poso (Breaking Down Poso Conflict), Gramedia, Jakarta, 2008.
 Regional Fraternity: Collaboration between Violent Groups in Indonesia and the Philippines, a chapter in a book of "Terrorism in South and Southeast Asia in the Coming Decade", ISEAS, Singapura, 2009.
 Bhayangkara di Bumi Cenderawasih (Bhayangkara in Cendrawasih), ISPI Strategic Series, Jakarta, 2013.
 Explaining Islamist Insurgencies, Imperial College, London, 2014
 Polri Dalam Arsitektur Negara (Police in State Architecture), LIPI, Jakarta, 2017.
 Democratic Policing, Gramedia, Jakarta, 2017.

Gallery

References 

1964 births
Living people
Indonesian police officers
People from Palembang
Indonesian Muslims
Indonesian people of Malay descent
Onward Indonesia Cabinet
Government ministers of Indonesia
Nanyang Technological University alumni
Recipients of the Darjah Utama Bakti Cemerlang